Port Whangārei is an industrial area of Whangārei, in Northland Region, New Zealand. It is southeast of the city centre, connected by a bridge across Limeburners Creek. It was once called Kioreroa.  The southernmost part of the area contains Port Nikau which has industrial buildings and commercial berths.

History
One of the early cemeteries for Whangārei was Kioreroa Cemetery, on the western part of what is now Port Whangārei. It was used from 1882 to 1946.

The area was developed from the 1920s as Whangārei's port, and in the mid-1960s it was the ninth-busiest port in New Zealand. It needed more space to handle the increasing size of ships, and Northport was developed at Marsden Point to replace it, with the transition complete in 2007. 

There has been a suggestion that the Royal New Zealand Navy might establish a base at Port Whangārei.

Demographics

Port-Limeburners had a population of 102 at the 2018 New Zealand census, an increase of 63 people (161.5%) since the 2013 census, and an increase of 51 people (100.0%) since the 2006 census. There were 36 households, comprising 69 males and 30 females, giving a sex ratio of 2.3 males per female. The median age was 46.9 years (compared with 37.4 years nationally), with 9 people (8.8%) aged under 15 years, 9 (8.8%) aged 15 to 29, 66 (64.7%) aged 30 to 64, and 18 (17.6%) aged 65 or older.

Ethnicities were 64.7% European/Pākehā, 26.5% Māori, 2.9% Pacific peoples, 14.7% Asian, and 2.9% other ethnicities. People may identify with more than one ethnicity.

The percentage of people born overseas was 35.3, compared with 27.1% nationally.

Although some people chose not to answer the census's question about religious affiliation, 58.8% had no religion, 26.5% were Christian, 8.8% had Māori religious beliefs, 2.9% were Hindu and 2.9% had other religions.

Of those at least 15 years old, 12 (12.9%) people had a bachelor's or higher degree, and 15 (16.1%) people had no formal qualifications. The median income was $22,800, compared with $31,800 nationally. 9 people (9.7%) earned over $70,000 compared to 17.2% nationally. The employment status of those at least 15 was that 51 (54.8%) people were employed full-time, 6 (6.5%) were part-time, and 3 (3.2%) were unemployed.

Notes

Populated places in the Northland Region
Suburbs of Whangārei